Jan Davidsz. de Heem or in-full Jan Davidszoon de Heem, also called Johannes de Heem or Johannes van Antwerpen or Jan Davidsz de Hem (c. 17 April 1606 in Utrecht – before 26 April 1684 in Antwerp), was a still life painter who was active in Utrecht and Antwerp. He is a major representative of that genre in both Dutch and Flemish Baroque painting.

Life

De Heem was born in Utrecht as Johannes van Antwerpen. He studied first under his father David de Heem the Elder (1570–1631), then under Balthasar van der Ast. He lived in Leiden from about 1625 to 1629, where he studied in 1629 under David Bailly (1584- c. 1657).

He moved to the Southern Netherlands and joined the Guild of Saint Luke of Antwerp in 1635 or 1636 and became a burgher of that city in 1637. However he was often absent, as attested by the duties he had to pay for this.  His remarkable talent gained him a considerable reputation. He could hardly satisfy the demand. De Heem was considered one of the greatest painters of his time. He was well paid and a portrait of Prince William III surrounded by a cartouche of flowers and fruit was sold for 2000 guilders, one of the highest prices ever paid for a painting during the Dutch Golden Age. His sons worked together with him in his workshop on the commissions for new paintings. He retouched their work and put his signature on the paintings.

He remained in Antwerp until 1667, when he moved back to Utrecht, where records trace his presence from 1668 to 1671. He left Utrecht in 1671 when French troops were approaching the city. It is not known when he finally returned to Antwerp, but his death there is recorded in the guild books.

Van Heem married twice, first with Alette van Weede with whom he had three surviving children on her death in 1643, one of which, Cornelis, would become a still life painter.  He married a second time in 1644 with Anna Catherina Ruckers with whom he had six more children, one of whom was Jan who would also become a still life painter.

Apart from his two sons, he had several apprentices: Michiel Verstylen, Alexander Coosemans, Thomas de Klerck, Lenaert Rougghe, Theodor Aenvanck, Andries Benedetti, Elias van den Broeck, Jacob Marrel, Hendrik Schoock and Abraham Mignon.

Work
De Heem was one of the greatest painters of still lifes in the Netherlands, combining a brilliance and harmony of colour along with an accurate rendering of objects: flowers, in all their variety; European and tropical fruits; lobsters and oysters; butterflies and moths; stone and metal; snails and sea shells.

His still lifes included fruit pieces, vanitas still lifes and flower pieces, but he is best known for his ornate or sumptuous still lifes, the so-called 'pronkstillevens'.  Some of his works are displays of abundance; others, only a festoon or a nosegay.

Often he would convey a moral or illustrate a motto: a snake lying coiled under grass; a skull on plants in bloom. Gold and silver cups or tankards are suggestive of the vanity of earthly possessions.  Salvation is seen allegorically as a chalice amid blossoms, and death as a crucifix in a wreath. Sometimes de Heem painted, alone or with others, Madonnas or portraits in garlands of fruit or flowers.

His signature varied: his initials (J. De Heem f.), or Johannes (IOANNES DE HEEM F.), or his father's name adjoined to his own (J. D. De Heem f.). Occasionally he provided a date (such as A. i65i), especially with his best work.

Collections

Of the one hundred or more of his pictures seen in European galleries, only 18 are dated. An early work shows a chased tankard with a bottle, a silver cup and a lemon on a marble table, dated 1640, in the Rijksmuseum in Amsterdam. A similar work of 1645, with the addition of fruit, flowers and a distant landscape, is at Longford Castle. A chalice in a wreath, with a radiant bouquet among wheat sheaves, grapes and flowers, is a masterpiece of 1648 in the Belvedere of Vienna. A wreath around a life-sized Madonna, dated 1650, in the museum of Berlin, shows that de Heem could paint brightly and harmoniously on a large scale. The Prado Museum owns a Table dated around 1651 and the Thyssen-Bornemisza Museum houses Flowers in a glass Vase with Fruit circa 1665.

In the Alte Pinakothek in Munich is a celebrated work of 1653 in which creepers mingle beautifully with gourds, blackberries, orange, myrtle and peach, and further enlivened with butterflies, moths and beetles. A landscape with a blooming rose tree, a jug of strawberries, a selection of fruit, and a marble bust of Pan, dated 1655, is in the Hermitage in St Petersburg.  Some of his works are kept at the Royal Museums of Fine Arts of Belgium in Brussels. A 1645 still life of a feast of fruit and lobster is in the gallery at the Allen Memorial Art Museum in Oberlin, Ohio. A simple still life of pewter goblets can be seen in the Barber Institute in Birmingham UK.

Family

A number of de Heems, of whom Jan Davidsz. was the most distinguished, painted works in similar styles, that are often hard to distinguish. These include a brother, two sons, of whom Cornelis became particularly successful, and at least one grandson by each son.

This family of painters started with the unknown father of David de Heem the Elder (1570–1631) and an unknown brother. This anonymous brother had a son, Jan or Johannes de Heem (c. 1603 - † probably after 1659), a painter of still lifes, flowers and fruits.

David de Heem the Elder had two sons, also painters: Jan Davidsz. de Heem (1606- † before 26 April 1684) and David Davidsz. de Heem (1610 - † after 1669).

Jan Davidsz. de Heem had three sons, all painters; from a first marriage: David Janszoon de Heem (29 November 1628 - † ?), Cornelis de Heem (1631–1695) and from a second marriage Jan de Heem (1650 - † ?).

Cornelis de Heem had one son who was a painter: David Corneliszoon de Heem (1663–1718).

Gallery

References

 
 Benezit E., Dictionnaire des Peintres, Sculpteurs, Dessinateurs et Graveurs - Librairie Gründ, Paris, 1976;  (in French)

Further reading
 (see index, v.1; Colorplate I, v.2)

External links

 
Web Gallery: Jan Davidsz. de Heem
Online gallery and literature at PubHist

1606 births
1684 deaths
Dutch Golden Age painters
Dutch male painters
Artists from Utrecht
Dutch still life painters
Painters from Antwerp
Flower artists